Đạo Mẫu is the worship of mother goddesses which was established in Vietnam in the 16th century. This worship is a branch of Vietnamese folk religion but is more shamanic in nature.

While scholars like Ngô Đức Thịnh propose that it represents a systematic worship of mother goddesses, Đạo Mẫu draws together fairly disparate beliefs and practices. These include the worship of goddesses such as Thiên Y A Na, Bà Chúa Xứ "Lady of the Realm", Bà Chúa Kho "Lady of the Storehouse", and Princess Liễu Hạnh, legendary figures like Âu Cơ, the Trưng Sisters (Hai Bà Trưng), and Lady Triệu (Bà Triệu), as well as the branch Four Palaces.

Practices

Serving the reflections (hầu bóng) 
The most prominent ritual of Đạo Mẫu is the ceremony of hầu bóng, in which a priest or priestess mimics the deities by dressing and acting like them. Many people mistake that hầu bóng is a form of mediumship ritual — known in Vietnam as lên đồng — much as practiced in other parts of Asia, such as South China, among the Mon people of Myanmar, and some communities in India; however, that is not correct. Although some of the priests and priestesses of Đạo Mẫu are believed to have the ability of spirit mediumship, this is a different practice entirely. The priest is in full control of their body during hầu bóng. A successful ceremony is one in which the priest feels the deities' essences but it does not mean the deities' spirits enter the priest's mortal body. As a religious leader authorised to perform the sacred rituals of a religion, especially as a mediatory agent between humans and one or more deities, the thanh đồng in Đạo Mẫu is more of the equivalent of a priest rather than a medium or a shaman.

The worshiping of the Mother Goddesses contributes to the appreciation of women in society. Recognized by UNESCO, this Vietnamese ritual was inscribed on Representative List in December 2016.

Although the Vietnamese government had initially proscribed the practice of such rituals, deeming them to be superstitions, they relented in 1987, once again permitting their practice.

Denominations

Four Palaces (Tứ Phủ) 

The most prominent form of Đạo Mẫu is Four Palaces (Tứ Phủ), which worships a hierarchical pantheon of Vietnamese indigenous deities with a strong influence from historical figures, Taoism and Buddhism. Four Palaces is the most common in the North. Other forms in different areas have also developed an interference with other local beliefs. The name literally means "Four Palaces", which includes the four realms Heaven, Mountains, Water and Earth.

Mother Goddess (Thánh Mẫu)

Holy Courtiers (Thánh Chầu)

Holy Mistresses (Thánh Cô)

See also
 Trưng sisters
 Lady Triệu
 Phùng Thị Chính
 Bùi Thị Xuân
 Matriarchy

References

External links 

 Đạo Mẫu Việt Nam
 Đạo Mẫu Đông A Phủ

Religion in Vietnam
Vietnamese folk religion